Steyn is a Dutch surname. Notable people with the surname include: 

 Andrie Steyn, South African cricketer
 Carole Steyn (born 1938), British abstract painter
 Christo Steyn (born 1961), South African tennis player
 Dale Steyn (born 1983), South African cricketer
 Douw Steyn (born 1952), South African billionaire businessman
 Esme Steyn (born 1953), South African lawn bowls player
 François Steyn (born 1987), South African rugby player
 Gary Steyn (born 1961), Zimbabwean cricketer
 Johan Steyn, Baron Steyn (1932–2017), South African jurist
 Lucas Cornelius Steyn (1903–1976), South African politician
 Mark Steyn (born 1959), Canadian journalist
 Martinus Theunis Steyn (1857–1916), South African lawyer, politician, and statesman
 Morné Steyn (born 1984), South African rugby player
 Pieter Steyn (1706–1772), Dutch politician
 Rudi Steyn (born 1967), South African cricketer
 Santjie Steyn (born 1972), South African lawn bowls player
 Trish Steyn (born 1952), South African lawn bowls player

Afrikaans-language surnames
Surnames of Dutch origin